Attack Force is a 1982 board game published by TSR.

Gameplay
Attack Force is a minigame in which one player is the Arcturan Federation and must destroy the Novaship with his Eagle and Falcon Star-Fighters.

Reception
John Rankin reviewed Attack Force in The Space Gamer No. 61. Rankin commented that "The unbalanced solo scenario and the one-dimensional nature of the game preclude it from becoming a favorite.  To be fair, Attack Force was really designed to introduce 10- to 12-year olds to the joys of adventure gaming.  Alas, in this respect, it fails.  If the ambiguities and poor development bother an experienced gamer, they're liable to turn away the novice."

References

Board games introduced in 1982
TSR, Inc. games